A thioamide (rarely, thionamide, but also known as thiourylenes) is a functional group with the general structure , where  are any groups (tipically organyl groups or hydrogen). They are analogous to amides but they exhibit greater multiple bond character along the C-N bond, resulting in a larger rotational barrier. One of the best-known thioamides is thioacetamide, which is used as a source of the sulfide ion and is a building block in heterocyclic chemistry.

Thioamides or anti-thyroid drugs are also a class of drugs that are used to control thyrotoxicosis.

Preparation and structure
Thioamides are typically prepared by treating amides with phosphorus sulfides such as phosphorus pentasulfide, a reaction first described in the 1870s. Alternative routes include the use of Lawesson's reagent or the reaction of nitriles with hydrogen sulfide:

The Willgerodt-Kindler reaction also affords benzylthioamides.

The C(R)(N)(S) core of thioamides is planar. Using thioacetamide as representative: the C-S, C-N, and C-C distances are 1.68, 1.31, and 1.50 Å, respectively. The short C-S and C-N distances indicate multiple bonding.

Thioamides in biochemistry and medicine
Thioamides are also a class of drugs that are used to control thyrotoxicosis. 

Thioamides have been incorporated into peptides as isosteres for the amide bond. Peptide modifications are analogues of the native peptide, which can reveal the structure-activity relationship (SAR). Analogues of peptides can also be used as drugs with an improved oral bioavailability. 
Thioamides inhibit the enzyme thyroid peroxidase in the thyroid, reducing the synthesis of triiodothyronine (T3) and thyroxine (T4), thereby blocking uptake of iodotyrosines from the colloid. They also block iodine release from peripheral hormone. Maximum effects occur only after a month, since hormone depletion is caused by reduced synthesis, which is a slow process.

Because thioamides can penetrate the placental barrier, caution is advised when used during pregnancy. Ten percent of patients report skin eruptions (such as macules and papules), urticaria, dermatitis, fever, and arthralgia; 0.03% of all patients develop agranulocytosis, aplastic anemia also a rare adverse effect.

Members of the thioamide group include methimazole, carbimazole (converted in vivo to methimazole), and propylthiouracil.

References

 
Functional groups